Batıkent is an underground rapid transit station of the Ankara Metro. It is located along Başkent Avenue at the intersection with 1777th Avenue. The station was originally opened as the western terminus of the M1 line on 29 December 1997. On 13 February 2014, it became the eastern terminus of the M3 line. Both lines use the same platform as the M3 is an extension of the M1.

References

External links
EGO Ankara - Official website
Ankaray - Official website

Railway stations opened in 1996
Ankara metro stations
1996 establishments in Turkey